Manslaughter is a legal term in various jurisdictions for the killing of a human being but different from murder.

Manslaughter may also refer to:

Law
 Manslaughter in English law, a homicide offence in English Law which does not amount to murder
 Culpable homicide, a legal term in various (mostly Commonwealth of Nations) jurisdictions for the killing of a human being with important variations of definition between those jurisdictions.
 Manslaughter (United States law)
 Voluntary manslaughter, a form of intentional homicide in American law

Entertainment
 Manslaughter (comics), a fictional character in the Marvel Universe 
 Manslaughter (1922 film), American film directed by Cecil B. DeMille
 Manslaughter (1930 film), American film directed by George Abbott
 Manslaughter (1957 film), Australian documentary made during the Warburton Ranges Controversy, Australia
 Manslaughter (2005 film), Danish film
 Manslaughter (2012 film), Dutch film
 Manslaughter (album), 2014 album by metal band Body Count
 "Manslaughter" (song), 2013 song by Lets Be Friends
 "Manslaughter", 2021 song by Pop Smoke from the album Faith